Vakhtang Balavadze (born August 23, 1978) is a Georgian engineer, professor, entrepreneur, and former politician. He was the Minister of Energy and Natural Resources of Georgia from August 13, 2012 to October 25, 2012.

Education 
Vakhtang Balavadze studied at Tbilisi Secondary School #140 in 1984-1995. In 1995, he entered Georgian Technical University in the Department of Construction Economics and Management.  Balavadze graduated with honors and received a Bachelor's degree of Engineer-Economist in 1999. In 2000-2002 Balavadze received his Master's degree from Georgian Technical.

Balavadze became a candidate for technical sciences in 2006.

Career
Since 2014, Balavadze has been an academic professor at the Georgian Technical University.  He is the head of the bachelor's program at San Diego State University - Georgia and also supervises the construction management bachelor program.

At the same time Balavadze works at Engineering Consulting Company   “FORCE”, in Tbilisi, Georgia, where he is the founder and chief project manager and also has the position of chief project engineer at Civil Engineering Design and Engineering Surveys Company, LTD “KAVTRANSPROJECT”.

Balavadze has received the "Presidential Order of Excellence”. He is a correspondent member of the Engineering Academy of Georgia, and the author of scientific papers and publications.

Political career 
In 1998, Balavadze joined the Young Citizens Union in Tbilisi, where he served as the inspector of the regional department. In 1999-2000, he became was deputy head of the regional department. In 2000 Balavadze was appointed as the head of the regional department and in 2002 became the senior secretary of the party.

In 2001 the political and social crisis led to the dissolution of the country’s most influential party, the Georgian Citizens Union.  Three new forces - the New Rights Party, United National Movement and Free Democrats were allocated from the ruling team. Vakhtang Balavadze was involved with the group of reformers in the creation of a new party in 2002. Accordingly, in 2002-2004 held other different positions. Among them, he was a member of the political council of the  “Democrats' Union”, the executive secretary of the Tbilisi City Organization, and the “Young Democrats’ Union” deputy chairman.

After that there was the Rose Revolution, the uniting of the “United National Movement” and the "Free Democrats" as a single party, participation in the 2004 parliamentary elections with the name of the new bloc "National Movement-Democrats" and winning a constitutional majority.

Accordingly, in 2004 Balavadze started as a representative of the election bloc “National Movement – Democrats” in the sixth term of the parliament of Georgia. In 2004 - 2008 he was the secretary of “National Movement –Democrats” faction, in 2006 - 2008 - The speaker of the party council. Later, the amendment was made in the registration of the bloc and from 2008 to 2012 Vakhtang Balavadze was the representative of the election bloc "United National Movement - for winning Georgia" in the sixth term of the parliament of Georgia. In 2008-2012 he was a faction member of the "United National Movement" and from 2012 to 2017 he was a member of the political council of the “United National Movement”

In 2012 he was appointed Minister of Energy and Natural Resources of Georgia, In 2013 Balavadze was appointed Governor of Imereti region.  In 2014 he was installed as the Nadzaladevi District Governor at Tbilisi City Hall.

In 2017, the party crisis led the United National Movement to the separation of one group of politicians with differing opinions and founding of a new political party "European Georgia - Movement for Liberty". With his teammates, Vakhtang Balavadze was a participant in the political process and in 2017-2018 he was a member of the political council and since 2018 has been a member of the founding board.

Legislative career 
Vakhtang Balavadze was a member of the Parliament of Georgia for two terms in 2004- 2012. In 2004-2008, he was in the legislative body of 6th Term of the Parliament of Georgia from the election bloc “National Movement – Democrats”. During these years he worked on four committees. He was a member of:
 the Defense and Security Committee - (2004-2005), 
 the Sector Economy and Economic Policy Committee - (2005-2008), 
the Budget and Finance Committee - (2006 - 2007) and 
 the Budget and Finance Committee - Deputy Chairperson (2007 - 2008).

In 2008-2012 Vakhtang Balavadze entered the legislative body from the election bloc "The United National Movement - For Winning Georgia" and in this period  was a member of the Budget and Finance Committee (2008 - 2009) and on the Procedural Issues And Rules Committee (2008 -2012). In 2009-2010 he was the Deputy Chairperson of the Budget and Finance Committee; in 2010-2012 he was elected Chairperson of the Committee of Regional Policy, Self-Government and Mountainous Regions.

Public Service 
Vakhtang Balavadze started a public servant's career in 2003. The Parliament of Georgia was his first position, and from 2003 to 2004 he served as first deputy head of the parliamentary staff.

From 2004 to 2012, he moved to the legislative body from the public space and was a member of the parliament for two terms. In 2012 he was appointed Minister of Energy and Natural Resources of Georgia.

Later, when the ruling party lost in the elections of 2 October 2012 and the power was transferred to the opposition coalition, “Georgian Dream”, President Mikheil Saakashvili made a governmental shuffle and the Minister of Energy and Natural Resources became Governor of  Imereti region. He heldx this position till 2013.

In 2013-2014 Vakhtang Balavadze returned to Tbilisi again and was appointed Nadzaladevi District Governor.

Academic Activity 
In 2006-2008 Vakhtang Balavadze became the Member of the Scientific-editorial board Scientific-technical journal “BUILDING”, later in 2017-2016 he was a Research fellow  at “Educational-Scientific Center for Bridge Testing" and he has participated in testing and examining of more than 80 bridges.

In 2014-2016 Vakhtang Balavadze worked on the Faculty of Transportation and Mechanical Engineering, Roads (Civil Engineering, Transportation and Mechanical Engineering Inter-Faculty) Department - Associate Professor (Invited).

In 2016-2019 Vakhtang Balavadze continues his academic career as an Academic Professor at Georgian Technical University at the Department of Construction Economics and Management.

In 2019 Vakhtang Balavadze begins to work at San Diego State University-Georgia as Supervisor of the Construction Management Bachelor Program.

Professional (Engineering) Experience and Career
In 2015 Vakhtang Balavadze founded Engineering Consulting Company   “FORCE”, where he is the chief manager of projects. In 2016 Vakhtang Balavadze started working as Chief Project Engineer at Civil Engineering Design and Engineering surveys Company, LTD ,” KAVTRANSPROJECT “.
 
Vakhtang Balavadze is a member of Construction Management Association of America (CMAA), Georgian Association of Consulting Engineers (ACEG) in Tbilisi, Georgia, and American Society of Civil Engineers (ASCE), Construction Institute CI.

References

1978 births
United National Movement (Georgia) politicians
Government ministers of Georgia (country)
Politicians from Tbilisi
Living people
Engineers from Tbilisi